The New Zealand Players were one of New Zealand's first professional theatre companies, active between 1952 and 1960. The company's director was Richard Campion, who with his wife and co-founder Edith Campion were former members of the New Zealand branch of the Unity Theatre people's theatre movement. Edith was a member of the Hannah family, and the company was funded by the Hannah Trust.

Other members of the company included Raymond Hawthorne, Nola Millar, Nyree Dawn Porter, Barbara Leake, George Swan, Rosalie Carey and Raymond Boyce and Louise Petherbridge.

See also 
 Southern Comedy Players

References 

Theatre companies in New Zealand
1952 establishments in New Zealand
1960 disestablishments in New Zealand